Bainbridge is a town in Monroe Township, Putnam County, in the U.S. state of Indiana. The population was 746 at the 2010 census.

History
Bainbridge was laid out in 1831. This town was named after the prominent war hero of the time, William Bainbridge. A post office has been in operation at Bainbridge since 1835. The town was incorporated in 1847.

Geography
Bainbridge is located at  (39.761640, -86.811157).

Demographics

2010 census
As of the 2010 census, there were 746 people, 289 households, and 198 families living in the town. The racial makeup of the town was 98.1% White, 0.1% Native American, 0.4% Asian, 0.3% from other races, and 1.1% from two or more races. Hispanic or Latino of any race were 0.1% of the population.

There were 289 households, of which 36.7% had children under the age of 18 living with them, 50.9% were married couples living together, 11.4% had a female householder with no husband present, 6.2% had a male householder with no wife present, and 31.5% were non-families. 26.6% of all households were made up of individuals, and 11.1% had someone living alone who was 65 years of age or older. The average household size was 2.58 and the average family size was 3.07.

The median age in the town was 37.5 years. 28.7% of residents were under the age of 18; 6.4% were between the ages of 18 and 24; 26.6% were from 25 to 44; 26.7% were from 45 to 64; and 11.7% were 65 years of age or older. The gender makeup of the town was 49.5% male and 50.5% female.

2000 census
As of the 2000 census, there were 743 people, 284 households, and 218 families living in the town. The racial makeup of the town was 99.06% White, 0.27% African American, 0.27% Native American and 0.40% Asian. Hispanic or Latino of any race were 0.81% of the population.

There were 284 households, out of which 39.8% had children under the age of 18 living with them, 59.2% were married couples living together, 13.7% had a female householder with no husband present, and 22.9% were non-families. 20.4% of all households were made up of individuals, and 8.1% had someone living alone who was 65 years of age or older. The average household size was 2.62 and the average family size was 3.00.

In the town, the population was spread out, with 28.0% under the age of 18, 10.0% from 18 to 24, 30.7% from 25 to 44, 19.7% from 45 to 64, and 11.7% who were 65 years of age or older. The median age was 34 years. For every 100 females, there were 92.5 males. For every 100 females age 18 and over, there were 88.4 males.

The median income for a household in the town was $36,852, and the median income for a family was $37,222. Males had a median income of $27,917 versus $21,172 for females. The per capita income for the town was $14,231. About 4.8% of families and 5.5% of the population were below the poverty line, including 7.1% of those under age 18 and 4.1% of those age 65 or over.

References

External links
 Town of Bainbridge, Indiana website

Towns in Putnam County, Indiana
Towns in Indiana